Ardee RFC is an Irish rugby team based in Ardee, County Louth, Ireland. They play in Division 3 of the Leinster League, organised by the Leinster Branch of the IRFU. The club colours are navy and white.

History 
Ardee RFC was founded in 1980 after a meeting of 22 people from Ardee Golf Club, they wanted to provide a rugby club for youths and juveniles in the mid-Louth area. The first adult match was played on St. Stephen's Day and against Athboy RFC, Ardee RFC officially began competing in the 1983/84 season.

In the 1988/89 season, the club purchased land at Townspark and it has been the club grounds of Ardee RFC since.

References
Ardee
Irish rugby union teams
Rugby clubs established in 1980
Rugby union clubs in County Louth
Sports clubs in County Louth